Laurinda A. Jaffe (born January 9, 1952) is an American biologist who is a Professor and chair at the University of Connecticut. Her research considers the physiological mechanisms that regulate oocyte cell and fertilisation. She was elected to the National Academy of Sciences in 2021.

Early life and education 
Jaffe was born in Pasadena, California. Her father, Lionel F. Jaffe, was a senior scientist at the Marine Biological Laboratory in the Woods Hole Oceanographic Institution. Her mother, Miriam (Walther) Jaffe, was a professor of astronomy at Purdue University. Jaffe was an undergraduate student at the University of Wisconsin–Madison. After two years, she moved to Purdue University, where she majored in biology. She was a graduate researcher at the University of California, Los Angeles, where she worked under the supervision of Susumu Hagiwara. Her doctoral research considered polyspermy in sea urchin eggs. After graduating, Jaffe worked as a postdoctoral researcher at Woods Hole Oceanographic Institution with Lewis Tilney and at the University of California, San Diego with Meredith Gould.

Research and career 
Jaffe studies the physiological mechanisms that regulate oocyte cell and fertilisation. In particular, she is interested in the meiosis process that takes place in mammalian ovarian follicles. Meiosis is a type of cell division that prepares the oocyte for fertilisation. The process begins during embryonic development, and then arrests for a prolonged period of time in a prophase. The follicle (including the oocyte and granulosa cells) regulates meiotic progression in the oocyte. She identified the proteins (Gs protein) and receptors (GPR3) that are responsible for meiotic prophase arrests. The activity of these proteins result in the production of cyclic adenosine monophosphate (cAMP), which keeps the cell cycles arrested. Meanwhile, the granulosa cells within the follicle regulate the hydrolysis of cAMP, a process which involves cyclic guanosine monophosphate (cGMP) as a phosphodiesterase inhibitor that maintains high cAMP and meiotic arrest. The signalling system within the granulosa cell switches in response to the luteinizing hormone, which Jaffe has shown lowers the cGMP. This decrease in cGMP can be monitored using confocal microscopy of mice follicles that express the Fluorescence Resonance Energy Transfer (FRET) sensor cGi500.

Jaffe has studied the processes that give rise to the fibroblast growth factor (FGF)-induced inhibition of bone growth. Hormonal signalling decreases the amount of cGMP by inactivating NPR2. In the ovaries, this causes the cGMP to resume meiotic function, whilst it diminishes growth within bones.

Awards and honors 

 2007 Elected Fellow of the American Association for the Advancement of Science
 2019 National Institutes of Health MERIT award
 2021 Elected to the National Academy of Sciences

Selected publications

References 

Living people
Members of the United States National Academy of Sciences
Fellows of the American Association for the Advancement of Science
People from Pasadena, California
Purdue University alumni
University of California, Los Angeles alumni
University of Wisconsin–Madison alumni
University of California, San Diego faculty
University of Connecticut faculty
American women biologists
1952 births
21st-century American women